The legal age of consent for sexual activity varies by jurisdiction across Asia. The specific activity engaged in or the gender of participants can also be relevant factors. Below is a discussion of the various laws dealing with this subject. The highlighted age refers to an age at or above which an individual can engage in unfettered sexual relations with another who is also at or above that age. Other variables, such as homosexual relations or close in age exceptions, may exist, and are noted when relevant, for example in Indonesia. Also, as noted in the Japanese section, several national laws and each local government ordinance may have different age rules for sexual activity, so sexual activity may be punishable even beyond the ages highlighted below.

Summary 

All jurisdictions in Asia per List of sovereign states and dependent territories in Asia:

Definitions

Table

Afghanistan
Sexual activity outside marriage is illegal in Afghanistan. According to the Ministry for the Propagation of Virtue and the Prevention of Vice, marriage is allowed at puberty.

Bahrain
Consensual sex outside of marriage is legally permissible for those aged 21 and above, regardless of gender and/or sexual orientation. If a married individual has sex with somebody they are not married to, the person they are married to is given the liberty, by the criminal procedure code, to file for an 'adultery' charge if they wanted to. They are also given the liberty to drop off the charge after filing it if they wanted to. However, the mentioned options would not be available after three months are passed from when the person learned about the adultery. The marriage of course should be recognized by the government for the mentioned options to be provided.

The marriageable age is 16 years.  Before this age, marriage requires authorization from the Shariah Court of the State of Bahrain.
 .
The minimum age to marry without permission from the girl's father or legal guardian is 21 years.

Rape is punished by imprisonment. Since 1986, the penalty is either life imprisonment or possibly the death penalty for victims under 16. Non-consent is assumed for unmarried women under 14. According to article 349 of the updated penal code, the death penalty for the rapist is eligible only if the rape causes death for the sexually assaulted female.

The law presumes non-consent of male victims less than 14 too. There is a prison sentence (maximum 10 years) for male victims under 16 (article 346) while article 347 gives an unspecified prison sentence with consenting male victims under 21.

Article 353 specifies:
No penalty shall be inflicted against a person who has committed one of the crimes set forth in the preceding Articles if he was subject to a final court judgement before concluding the marriage, such judgement shall be subject to a stay of execution and its penal effects shall cease.

Bangladesh
According to the section 9 (1) of the Women and Child Abuse Prevention Act, 2003, it is defined as rape to have sexual intercourse with a woman with or without her consent, when she is under fourteen (14) years of age.

Article 375 specifies that “A man is said to commit "rape" who except in the case hereinafter excepted, has sexual intercourse with a woman (5) With or without her consent, when she is under fourteen years of age. (Exception) Sexual intercourse by a man with his wife, the wife not being under thirteen years of age, is not rape.

Bhutan
The age of consent in Bhutan is 18 regardless of gender or sexual orientation, according to Article 183 of the Penal Code of Bhutan.

Brunei
Any kind of sexual activity outside of a heterosexual marriage is illegal in Brunei. The minimum age for marriage is 16.

Article 2 of this Act determines the offence as follows:
Any person who has or attempts to have carnal knowledge (sexual intercourse) of a girl under the age of sixteen (16) years except by way of marriage, shall be guilty of an offense: Penalty, imprisonment for a term which shall not be less than 2 years and not more than 7 years and to whipping not exceeding 24 strokes of the rattan in the case of an adult or 12 strokes of the rattan in the case of a youthful offender.

Cambodia
The age of consent in Cambodia is 15 regardless of gender or sexual orientation. The age of consent in this country is determined by Article 8, of Chapter 4 (Debauchery) of the Law on Suppression of the Kidnapping, Trafficking, and Exploitation of Human Beings, which has been specifically enacted to prohibit sex with children under 15. The law prohibits "debauchery" with a child under 15, and this term (the original Cambodian word is  has been interpreted by courts to forbid any form of sexual conduct (both consensual and non-consensual; both 'ordinary' sex and paid sex) with a child under 15. This is the main legal tool used to prosecute foreigners engaging in child sex tourism in Cambodia.

Article 8 of the 'Law on Suppression of the Kidnapping, Trafficking, and Exploitation of Human Beings' states, "Any person who commits acts of debauchery involving a minor below 15 years old, even if there is consent from the concerned minor, or even if the person has bought such minor from someone else or from a pimp, shall be punished by ten (10) to twenty (20) years in prison. In case of repeat offenses, the maximum punishment term shall be applied."

Mainland China
In Mainland China, the age of consent for sexual activity is 14 years, regardless of gender or sexual orientation. Chinese law defines statutory rape as having sex with a girl who is less than fourteen years of age. A five-year prison sentence and fine may result if the girl under 14 years of age was acting as a prostitute. In August 2015, the law concerning underage prostitutes was repealed. The Statutory rape law now applies to underage prostitution as well. Persons with Special Duties towards minor females who have attained the full age of 14 shall be held accountable for rape if they compel the victim engaging in sexual relations with them by taking advantage of their dominant positions or the helpless situations of the victim.

In 2020 there was a proposal to raise the age of consent in the wake of a scandal in the city of Yantai.

In 2021 there was a proposal to criminalize teachers having intercourse with students in primary and junior high levels.

East Timor
The age of consent in East Timor is 14 regardless of gender or sexual orientation, per Article 177. However, sex acts with an adolescent aged 14–15 years are illegal if an adult practices them with the adolescent by "taking advantage of the inexperience" of that adolescent. (Article 178).

Article 177. Sexual abuse of a minor:
 Any person who practices vaginal, anal or oral coitus with a minor aged less than 14 years is punishable with 5 to 20 years' imprisonment.
 Any person who practices any act of sexual relief with a minor aged less than 14 years is punishable with 5 to 15 years' imprisonment.

Article 178. Sexual acts with an adolescent:
 Any person who, being an adult and apart from situations provided in this section, practices any relevant sexual act with a minor aged between 14 and 16 years, taking advantage of the inexperience of the same, is punishable with up to 5 years' imprisonment.

Hong Kong
In Hong Kong the age of consent for sexual activity is 16 regardless of gender or sexual orientation. However, the age of consent for a female receiving anal sex is 21.

Under s.124 of the Crimes Ordinance (Cap.200), a man who has unlawful sexual intercourse with a girl under the age of 16 shall be liable to imprisonment for 5 years. Under s.123 of the Crimes Ordinance, a man who has unlawful sexual intercourse with a girl under the age of 13 shall be liable to imprisonment for life.

Under s.122 of the Crimes Ordinance, a person under the age of 16 cannot in law give any consent which would prevent an act being an assault for the purposes of indecent assault. Hence, a woman who has sexual activity with a boy or a girl under 16 will be prosecuted under this section.

Under s.127 of the Crimes Ordinance, a person who takes an unmarried girl under the age of 18 out of the possession of her parent or guardian against the will of the parent or guardian with the intention that she shall have unlawful sexual intercourse with men or with a particular man shall be guilty of an offence and shall be liable on conviction on indictment to imprisonment for 7 years."

The previous position regarding homosexual couples is contained in s.118C which provides that a man who commits or suffers to commit buggery with a man under the age of 21 is liable on conviction on indictment to imprisonment for life. However, this section was struck down as unconstitutional in Leung TC William Roy v Secretary for Justice. Hence, the age of consent between two males have been effectively equalized with that between a male and a female, which is 16.

Prior to 2012 there was a presumption that a male minor under 14 could not consent to sexual intercourse under any circumstances. The law was changed after a 13-year-old boy attacked a 5-year-old girl at a Chai Wan hospital ward; the prosecution was unable to convict him of rape, instead only able to do so for indecent assault. In 2015 an 11-year-old boy and a 13-year-old boy were arrested after they were found having sex with an 11-year-old girl. Under the new laws they have the possibility of having the maximum sentence of life in prison.

India
India's age of consent for sex is set at 18 years under the Criminal Law (Amendment) Act, 2013, regardless of gender.

In 1892, the marital rape and subsequent death of a 10-year-old girl, Phulmoni Dasi, caused the age of consent to be raised from 10 to 12. In 1949, it was raised to 16 after agitation from women's groups about the adverse effect of early pregnancy. . On 3 April 2014 the Criminal Law (Amendment) Act, 2013 came into effect, which raised the legal permissible age for sexual consent from 16 to 18. Although the Criminal Law (Amendment) Act, 2013 initially sought to lower the age to 16, it was set at 18 due to political pressure from conservative parties. Section 375 reads: A man is said to commit "rape" if he (...) Sixthly – With or without her consent, when she is under eighteen years of age.

Legal action on marital rape 
Protection of Children from Sexual Offences Act, 2012 disallows any such sexual relationships and puts such crimes within marriages as an aggravated offense. A Public Interest Litigation filled by Independent Thought, an organization working on child rights law, was heard in the Supreme Court of India for declaring the exception allowing marital rape within prohibited child marriages as unconstitutional: Independent Thought vs. Union of India [W.P(civil) 382 of 2013]. In the judgment, delivered on 11 October, the Supreme Court bench consisting of Justices Madan B. Lokur and Deepak Gupta read down Exception 2 to Section 375 of the Indian Penal Code (IPC) to hold that sexual intercourse by a man with his own wife if she is below 15 years of age would amount to rape. According to Section 375 Exception, Sexual Intercourse by a man with his own wife, the wife not being under 15 years of age, is not rape.

The Section 377 of the Indian Penal Code bans "carnal intercourse against the order of nature". It was used to prosecute people for having anal or oral sex, although prosecutions were rare. The law was constitutionally challenged and subsequently read down by the Delhi High Court in 2009 for violating the human rights of sexual minorities. In 2013, the Supreme Court overturned the Delhi High Court's judgment, recriminalizing homosexuality. However, in 2018, the Supreme Court, on hearing a fresh batch of petitions, declared some parts of the law unconstitutional on the issue, setting the age of consent for consensual homosexual sex at 18, same age for consensual heterosexual sex.

Indonesia
According to the Indonesian Penal Code article 287, the age of consent in Indonesia is 15 years old. The age of consent is the minimum age at which an individual is considered legally old enough to consent to participation in sexual activity. Individuals aged 15 or younger in Indonesia are not legally able to consent to sexual activity, and such activity may result in prosecution for statutory rape or the equivalent local law.

Even though the age of consent is 15 years old, the offender can only be charged and prosecuted if a legal complaint is lodged to the law enforcement. Exception to this law is when the age of the victim is under 12 years old, or under certain circumstances such as bodily injury or incest. Stipulated a minimum sentence of 12 years for sexual intercourse with females under the age of 12.
However, under the Child Protection Act, the age of consent could be raised to 18. The argument used is that sexual acts with a child could result in bodily and mental injury, while the definition of a child is anyone who is under 18 years old. A reported court verdict using the Child Protection Act was done in 2009 against an Australian national.

The age of consent for a homosexual activity is 18 years old in Indonesia, same for a heterosexual activity.

Iran
Sex outside of marriage is illegal in Iran. The minimum age of marriage in Iran is 15 for men and 13 for women. Ways around these regulations include temporary marriages (Nikah mut‘ah). With the permission of a court, girls may marry at a younger age.  In 2010, as many as 42,000 children aged between 10 and 14 were married, and 716 girls younger than 10 had wed.

Iraq
The age of consent in Iraq is set at 18, regardless of gender and/or sexual orientation. "Any person who sexually assaults a boy or girl under the age of 18 without the use of force, menaces or deception is punishable by detention..."

"Any person who has sexual intercourse with a female relative to the third generation under the age of 15 with her consent and the offence leads to her death, to pregnancy or loss of virginity [is punishable by jail]."

Israel
According to the Israeli Penal Code of 1977 the age of consent in Israel is 16 regardless of gender or sexual orientation, for any form of sexual relations involving penetration (unless the person above 16 is the one being penetrated - in that case the age of consent is 14). In all cases that don't involve penetration, the age of consent is 14 (for both heterosexual and homosexual activities). A special case arises when a person aged 14 or 15 had sexual relations with an older partner; in this case the older partner would be exempt of criminal liability if three conditions are met: the age difference between the partners was less than three years, the younger partner gave consent and the act was done out of "regular friendly relations" and without the abuse of power.

Japan
The Penal Code of Japan (1907) sets a national age of consent of 13. Article 176 ('Forcible Indecency') stipulates a penalty of 6 months to 10 years of imprisonment for "indecent acts" committed upon males and females under the age of 13, and Article 177 ('Rape') stipulated a minimum sentence of 3 years for sexual intercourse with females under the age of 13. In 2017, Article 177 was amended to specify vaginal, anal, and oral intercourse and expanded to include all persons (male and female) under 13. The amendment also increased the minimum prison sentence from 3 years to 5 years. At the 211th Congress, which will be held from January to June 2023, there is a proposal to increase the age of sexual consent from 13 to 16 by 2023. There is an exception to this revised penal code: only if one person who engages in sexual activity is between the ages of 13 and 15 and the other person is older than 5 years, the older person will be punished. This is to prevent, for example, two 15-year-olds from being punished for having sexual intercourse with each other.

Several national and local laws further regulate adolescent sexual acts. The anti-prostitution clause of the national  forbids "causing" individuals under 18 to perform sexual acts through direct or indirect physical or psychological pressuring, but does not prohibit otherwise-consensual acts. An array of local ordinances adopted in all 47 prefectures known as  forbid sexual acts judged  between adolescents (persons under 18) and adults; the laws do not punish sexual acts solely between adolescents. A 1985 decision of the Supreme Court of Japan on Fukuoka Prefecture's bylaw held that the ordinances were not to be broadly interpreted as forbidding all adult–adolescent sexual acts, but rather narrowly interpreted as forbidding those acts "conducted by unfair means that take advantage of the juvenile's mental or physical immaturity, such as by enticing, threatening, deceiving, or confusing, as well as [acts] where the juvenile is treated merely as an object to satisfy one's own sexual desires." The court also ruled that adult–adolescent sexual acts within "socially accepted norms", such as those within marriage, engagement, or a "similar sincere relationship", were not "indecent". As of 2004, about 1,000 offenses by adults are punished annually under the bylaws; a typical penalty is a ¥300,000 fine and a suspended sentence.

In 2020, a group of university students submitted a petition to the government to raise the national age of consent under the Penal Code to 16.

Jordan
The age of consent in Jordan is set at 16, regardless of gender and/or sexual orientation, according to the country's penal code.

Kazakhstan
The age of consent in Kazakhstan is 16, according to article 122 of the Crime Criminal Code.

Article 122. Sexual Intercourse and Other Actions of a Sexual Character with a Person Under Sixteen Years of Age Sexual intercourse, sodomy, or lesbianism or other acts of sexual nature, with a person who did not reach sixteen years of age, the guilty party being aware of that fact, shall be punished by restriction of freedom for a period up to three years, or by detention under arrest for a period up to six months, or deprivation of freedom for a period up to five years.

Kuwait
Sexual activity outside marriage is illegal in Kuwait. The marriageable age is 15 for girls and 17 for boys.

Kyrgyzstan
The age of consent in Kyrgyzstan is 16, regardless of gender or sexual orientation. This is established by Article 132 of the penal code, and only applies to offenders over age 18.

Article 133 forbids "lecherous actions" against persons below 14 committed without violence. Anyone aged 16 (the general age of criminal responsibility) or above can be punished under this section.

Laos
The age of consent in Laos is 15 regardless of gender or sexual orientation. Article 129 of the Laos Penal Code provides for a penalty of 1–5 years' imprisonment and a fine of 2–5 million kip.

Lebanon
The age of consent for sex in Lebanon is 18 for both males and females in regardless of gender or sexual orientation.

Article 505 of the Penal Code states, "Whoever commits a sexual act with a minor of less than fifteen (15) years, shall be punished with hard labor of up to fifteen (15) years. This penalty shall be for a minimum of five (5) years, if the victim has not attained the age of twelve (12) years. And whoever commits a sexual act with a minor aged more than fifteen (15) years but less than eighteen (18) years, shall be punished by imprisonment for a period varying between 2 months and 2 years."

Macau
The general age of consent in Macau is 14, regardless of gender or sexual orientation. Although people under the age of 18 years are considered minors, the Criminal Code does not criminalize sex with people older than 16 years of age (except in the specific case of minors aged 16 to 18 years old entrusted to an adult for education or assistance purposes whom have abused such position (article 167/1(b) of the Macau Criminal Code)).

Sex with minors younger than 14 years old is more severely punished (1 to 8 years' imprisonment) than with minors aged 14 to 16 years old (up to 4 years' imprisonment if the perpetrator abused the minor's inexperience). Anal sex, irrespective of the gender or orientation of the participants (male-male, female-female, male-female), has an aggravated punishment (3 to 10 years of jail if practiced with a minor under the age of 14 and up to 4 years if practiced with an older minor).

Malaysia
The de facto age of consent for heterosexual sex in Malaysia is 16 for both sexes, as homosexual activity in Malaysia is illegal.

Under the Malaysian Penal Code (Act 574), Section 375, the specified age is 16;

However, Article 17 the Sexual Offenses Against Children Act of 2017 makes any sexual touching of a child (defined as under 18 years) punishable by up to 20 years imprisonment.

Maldives
Sexual activity outside marriage is illegal in Maldives. The legal age of marriage is 18 for both males and females.

Mongolia
The age of consent in Mongolia is 16, regardless of gender or sexual orientation.

Myanmar
The age of consent in Myanmar is 16. It was raised from 14 with the amendment of the Myanmar Penal Code section 375, paragraph 5 in 2016.

If married, the legal age is now 15.

Nepal
The age of consent in Nepal is 18 regardless of gender or sexual orientation.

North Korea
The age of consent in North Korea is 15. Article 153 of the criminal law states that a man who has sexual intercourse with a girl under the age of 15 shall be "punished gravely."

Oman
Sexual activity outside marriage is illegal in Oman.

Pakistan
Sexual activity outside marriage is illegal in Pakistan. The normal minimum legal age for marriage is 18 for both sexes.

Palestinian

Gaza Strip
In the Gaza Strip, any kind of sexual activity outside marriage is illegal.

West Bank
The age of sexual consent is the same as in Jordanian Article 306 of the Penal Code. Consensual sex is legal at the age of 16 years.

Philippines
The minimum age for consensual sex is set at 16 years, regardless of gender and/or sexual orientation. There is a close in age exemption for children aged 13–15 if their partner is less than three years older.

Until 2022, the age of consent was 12. Sexual intercourse with a person under the age of 12 was defined as rape, under Chapter 3, Article 266 of the Anti-Rape Law of 1997.

However, while consensual sex with a person under age 18 is not statutory rape, it is still a violation of the law if the child is found to be "exploited in prostitution or subject to other sexual abuse". Under Republic Act No. 7610, a child is defined as a person below 18 years of age and the law reads:

"Other sexual abuse" requires "some form of compulsion equivalent to intimidation". The courts have specified that "influence" means "improper use of power or trust in any way that deprives a person of free will and substitutes another's objective".

Although it does not specifically deal with sexual activity, Article VI, Section 10 of Republic Act 7610 can be considered to establish a de facto maximum close in age exception of 10 years for minors aged 12 to 17 years.

Articles 337–338 of the same Anti-Rape Law of 1997 specifies the crime of "simple seduction"; this requires gaining the consent of a 12-17-year-old through the use of deceit (generally a false promise of marriage), and Article 343 that defines eloping with a girl 12–18 as consented abduction, which is also outlawed.

Several proposals have been made to increase the age of sexual consent from the current 12 to 18 years old in the 2010s. In 2020, the Philippine House of Representatives Committees on Revision of Laws and Welfare of Children passed a proposal to raise it to 16. In September 2021, the Philippine Senate unanimously voted in favor of the age of consent bill, with 22 senators backing it and an abstention by one senator, and President Rodrigo Duterte signed the Senate proposal into law in March 2022.

Qatar
Any kind of sexual activity outside marriage is illegal. According to the Family Act, the minimum age of marriage is 18 for boys and 16 for girls. The court may allow a marriage below the minimum age, but it requires the consent of the legal guardian as well as the consent of the two persons to be married.

Saudi Arabia
Any kind of sexual activity outside marriage is illegal in Saudi Arabia. In 2019, Saudi Arabia officially banned all marriages under the age of 18 for both men and women. The push to ban child marriage was initially opposed by senior clergy, who argued that a woman reaches adulthood at puberty. However, the Saudi Shura Council had outlawed marriages under the age of 15, and required court approval for those under 18. In accordance with the Child Protection Law, the law has a provision that states "Before the conclusion of the marriage contract, it is necessary to ensure that a person marrying under the age of 18 will not be harmed, whether male or female."

Singapore
The general age of consent in Singapore is set at 16, regardless of gender and/or sexual orientation. However, where there is a relationship of trust, authority or dependency, the age of consent is 18. The relationship must not be exploitative of the younger person.

In addition, Sections 375, 376, 376A, 376AA, 376EA, 376EC, 376EE, 377BL and 377D criminalize sexual activity with individuals below the age of 18 if the relationship is deemed exploitative of the younger person. Section 377CA stipulates that the court can determine if such a relationship is exploitative depending on the "circumstances of each case" - including age gap between the accused and the youth, the nature of the relationship, and the degree of control or influence exercised by the accused person over the minor.  It also stipulates that - unless the accused is married to the younger partner - such relationships will be deemed exploitative until proven otherwise, if:
(a) the accused person is the parent, step-parent, guardian or foster parent of the minor;
(b) the accused person is the de facto partner of the parent, guardian or foster parent of the minor;
(c) the accused person is a member of the teaching or management staff of the school or educational institution at which the minor is a student;
(d) the accused person has an established personal relationship with the minor in connection with the provision of religious, sporting, musical or other instruction to the minor;
(e) the accused person is a custodial officer of an institution in which the minor is detained;
(f) the accused person is a registered medical practitioner, a registered traditional Chinese medicine practitioner or a psychologist and the minor is a patient of the accused person;
(g) the accused person is an advocate and solicitor or a counsellor and the minor is a client of the accused person.

In addition, Section 376B criminalizes commercial sexual activity with youth under 18 - regardless of whether it occurs within or outside Singapore.  Section 376D also further criminalizes attempting to travel outside Singapore for the purposes of committing such actions outside Singapore.

Homosexuality between females was decriminalized in 2007, and on November 29, 2022, Parliament of Singapore repealed section 377A of the Penal Code and decriminalized homosexuality between males.

South Korea
In South Korea, sexual activity with a person under the age of 16 (in international age, not "Korean age") is considered statutory rape, unless the other party is under 19. Sex with a child under 16 is considered statutory rape under all circumstances. Prior to 2020 the age of consent in South Korea was 13.

By 1894, extramarital sex was punished by cudgeled 90s, which could lead to death. It is difficult to confirm how the Age of Consent Act of 1894-1910 was enforced.

Sri Lanka
The age of consent in Sri Lanka is 16 regardless of gender or sexual orientation. However, girls belonging to Sri Lanka's Moor and Malay minorities representing approximately 10% of the national population are allowed to marry after 12 years of age and below the age of 12 with the approval of the religious leader, Moulavi and either father, brother, uncle, grandfather.

(...)

(e) with or without her consent when she is under sixteen years of age, unless the woman is his wife who is over twelve years of age and is not judicially separated from the man.

365B. (1) Grave sexual abuse is committed any person who, for sexual gratification, does any act, by the use of his genitals or any other part of the human body or any Instrument on any orifice or part of the body of any other person, being an act which does not amount to rape under section 363, in circumstances falling under any of the following descriptions, that is to say:

(a) without the consent of the other person;

(aa) with or without the consent of the other person when the other person is under sixteen years of age;

(...)

Syria
The age of consent in Syria is 15, per Article 491.

Article 491:

1. Every person who has sexual intercourse with a minor under 15 years of age shall be liable to a term of nine years' imprisonment at hard labour.

2. The said term shall be not less than 15 years if the child is under 12 years of age.

Taiwan
The age of consent in Taiwan is 16 regardless of gender. The sentence is reduced or exempted if the offender is under 19. If the offender is under 18, it's an offense indictable only upon a complaint.

Tajikistan
The age of consent in Tajikistan is 16, as specified in article 141 of the Criminal Code. The penalty is specified as deprivation of freedom for 2 to 5 years.

Article 141. Sexual Intercourse And Other Actions of Sexual Character With an Individual Under 16 Years of Age

"(1) Sexual intercourse, homosexuality or lesbianism committed by an individual at the age of 18 years with an individual under 16 years of age when there are no elements of the crime stipulated by Article 138 and Article 139 of the present Code, is punishable by deprivation of freedom for a period of 2 to 5 years."

Articles 138 and 139 provide harsher penalties for Rape and Forcible sex against minors, including the possible death penalty for rape of a girl under 14.

Thailand
The age of consent in Thailand is 15 regardless of gender or sexual orientation, as specified by article 279 of the Thai Criminal Code. The current legislation applies to all regardless of gender or sexual orientation.

However, parts of the Code of Thailand.pdfPrevention and Suppression of Prostitution Act, which disallow any sexual contact with prostitutes under the age of 18, are widely interpreted by some local authorities to cover sexual acts classed as "obscenity for personal gratification". However, the Penal Code Amendment Act of 1997 (Section 283 bis) implies this to be within the context of sexual trafficking.   A high-profile example of this application of the law was a statutory rape charge filed against the lead singer of the Thai band Big Ass for allegedly having had sex with a (then) 16-year-old girl. The charge was filed by the girl after the singer refused to take responsibility for her baby. The singer has since been cleared of being the baby's father due to the results of a paternity test and he received 2 years suspended sentence.

Turkey
The age of consent in Turkey is 15.

According to Article 104 of the Turkish Penal Code (Türk Ceza Kanunu), sexual intercourse with minors aged 15, 16 and 17 can only be prosecuted upon a complaint.These complaints require the intention of the youth over the age of 15 and not the parents. However, if the offender is a person who is forbidden to marry the child by law or is a person who is obliged to take care of the child due to adoption or foster care, then the prosecution doesn't require a complaint and the punishment is aggravated.

Article 103 regulates any kind of sexual activity with minors under 15 (or minors under 18 who lack the ability to understand the legal meanings and consequences of such actions) as child sexual abuse.

History
The Ottoman Empire, a predecessor state to the Republic of Turkey, decriminalized sodomy in 1858. The age of consent in Turkey was set at 15 for both heterosexual and homosexual sex in the 1926 penal code, but this was raised to 18 in 1953. The new penal code of 2004 also set the age of consent for both heterosexual and homosexual sex at 18, with some differences, such as the act of having sexual intercourse with a minor over 15 being punishable upon a complaint.

Turkmenistan
The age of consent in Turkmenistan is 16.

United Arab Emirates
Sexual activity outside marriage is illegal in the United Arab Emirates. The legal age for marriage is 18 for both sexes.

In 2020, United Arab Emirates decriminalized sex outside of marriage. Consensual sex will be punished by the law if the victim, male or female, is under 18 years of age, or if the victim is deprived of their will due to their young age, insanity or mentally challenged or if the culprit is a first degree relative of the victim or responsible for their upbringing or usual care or has an authority of the minor victim. However, in November 2021, the country have instated a new penal code that reintroduces the criminalization of consensual sex outside of marriage, which had been dropped from the older law as part of the 2020 amendments.

A person convicted of committing sexual intercourse with a minor or mentally challenged person by force would be punished by the death penalty.

Uzbekistan
The age of consent in Uzbekistan is 16 for heterosexual males (oral sex for homosexual males) and both lesbian and heterosexual females. Only male homosexual anal intercourse is punishable with imprisonment for up to three years (called Besoqolbozlik).

Sexual relations with a person under sixteen (16) years of age, Clause 128 of the Criminal Code: (1) A sexual relation or satisfaction of sex requirements in the unnatural form with a person who was obviously less than sixteen (16) years old, shall be punished by corrective labour measures for up to two (2) years or by the arrest up to six (6) months, or with imprisonment for up to three (3) years.

Vietnam
The 2015 Penal Code indicates that the age of consent in Vietnam is 16 regardless of gender or sexual orientation.

Article 145 criminalizes sexual activity with those aged 13–15 in situations not amounting to rape (article 142 - requires threat or violence) or sexual abuse (article 144 - employing "trickery" to make a 13-15-year-old who is the offender's care-dependent or a person in extreme need "reluctantly engage in sexual intercourse or other sexual activities".

Yemen
Any kind of sexual activity outside marriage is illegal in Yemen. Until recently, Yemeni law set the age of marriage at 15. However, that law has been eradicated. Now, "Yemeni law allows girl of any age to wed, but it forbids sex with them until the indefinite time they are suitable for sexual intercourse.'" In 1999, the minimum marriage age of fifteen for women, rarely enforced, was abolished; the onset of puberty, interpreted by ulama to be at the age of nine, was set as a requirement for consummation of marriage.

In April 2008, the case of Nujood Ali, a 10-year-old girl who successfully obtained a divorce, sparked headlines around the world, and prompted calls to raise the legal age for marriage to 18. Later in 2008, the Supreme Council for Motherhood and Childhood proposed to define the minimum age for marriage at 18 years. The law was passed in April 2009, but dropped the following day following maneuvers by opposing parliamentarians. Negotiations to pass the legislation continue.

See also
 Age of consent
 Age of consent reform
 Ages of consent in Africa
 Ages of consent in Oceania
 Ages of consent in Europe
 Ages of consent in North America
 Ages of consent in South America
 Sex education
 Comprehensive sex education

Notes

References

Law-related lists
Asia
Adolescent sexuality in Asia